Lule Warrenton (June 22, 1862 – May 14, 1932) was an American actress, director, and producer during the silent film era. She appeared in more than 80 films between 1913 and 1922. She was born in Flint, Michigan and died in Laguna Beach, California and was the mother of cinematographer Gilbert Warrenton.

Early life
Warrenton was born to a production manager father. Under the supervision of her uncle, Sheridan Corbyn, Warrenton had played child parts and had been and continued to be on stage and in motion pictures for most of her life.

Warrenton attended St. Rose's Convent and later studied at the University of Michigan.  Following her time at Michigan, Warrenton began her stage career as an elocutionist at the University of Notre Dame.  She later progressed into a Shakespearian reader, performing in her first show at Victoria Rifle's Armory in Montreal, Quebec, Canada.

Actress
Warrenton appeared in a total of 81 films over the course of her career. Although she claimed a few lead roles, she generally, and more often, played supporting roles. Warrenton, more popularly appeared within the genres of comedy or westerns. She had the reputation of being a versatile actress, and played an assortment of diverse roles including a black woman in The Queen of Jungleland and a male role as a Chinese Mandarin, complete with a mustache, under director Henry McRae.

In a review of one of her performances in the Pittsburgh Press, Warrenton was described as "playing different parts, the more difficult the better, is the work and pastime of Lule Warrenton".

Director

Better known for her career as a director, Warrenton became the only woman director in the world at the time to have her own studio during her time at Universal.  Warrenton did some of the writing for her films, but her assistant Allen Watt took responsibility for the majority of the writing.  Warrenton's son, Gilbert Warrenton, was often in charge of photography in many of his mother's motion pictures.

Warrenton began her directing career by primarily filming comedies, but later made the previously unprecedented move to making films specifically designed for children, which she called "Film for Little Ones". Calling Linda was her first Film for Little Ones in 1916.  Warrenton directed and produced A Bit o'Heaven in 1917, which featured four-year-old child acting prodigy Mary Louise; this film  was an adaptation of Kate Douglas Wiggin's novel The Birds' Christmas Carol that sold over 1.5 million copies. Warrenton and Louise did multiple films together.

Due to her reputation as a great handler of "child players," Warrenton became known in Hollywood circles as "mother," and it has been stated that she "has no peers in the handling of child players."

Social influence
Warrenton was somewhat of a pioneer for the progression of womanhood and the inclusion of females in the workplace, especially within Hollywood.

Aside from being the only female director in the world to have her own studio, Warrenton also made a name for herself, by notably converting her own private home into a social center for women in Hollywood. She was known to be a key contributor for the movement within the Hollywood Film Company to establish a permanent home for these countless extra girls working in Hollywood.

Warrenton also was one of four founders of the Hollywood Studio Club, an organization for which any woman connected to a motion picture studio in any capacity is eligible to join.  This drama club originated in the basement of the Hollywood Public Library. Eventually the Y.W.C.A. got involved and the group flourished, growing in size all the way up to the 175 members it contained in 1917.

Post Universal Studios career
Warrenton began her career at Universal Studios in 1912, but severed ties with the film giant in 1917 and continued to produce juvenile films independently.

Following the split with Universal, Warrenton eventually left Hollywood and joined the San Diego Conservatory of Music while simultaneously becoming the head of an all women film company, also located in San Diego.

Personal life
Warrenton had two children, although most people only know about her son Gilbert.  She also had a daughter, Mrs. Virginia Zimmerman, who married a doctor in Los Angeles.

While still in her time at Universal, Warrenton contracted pneumonia in 1915, causing her six weeks of being bed ridden and unable to work. Upon her return to work, she was back in bed a day later, causing her to miss more time and opportunities.

Warrenton stood at a height of five feet, six inches tall, weighed 150 pounds, and had long brown hair with blue eyes. She died in 1932 at Laguna Hospital.

Partial filmography

 The Werewolf (1913)
 Samson (1914)
 Bound on the Wheel (1915)
 Jewel (1915)
 Secret Love (1916)
 Her Bitter Cup (1916)
 The Gilded Spider (1916)
 Bobbie of the Ballet (1916)
 It Happened in Honolulu (1916)
 The Secret of the Swamp (1916)
 Princess Virtue (1917)
 The Silent Lady (1917)
 Daughter Angele (1918)
 Heart of the Sunset (1918)
 The Wilderness Trail (1919)
 Molly of the Follies (1919)
 A Fugitive from Matrimony (1919)
 The Sin That Was His (1920)
 Blind Hearts (1921)
 The Jolt (1921)
 The Dangerous Moment (1921)
 Ladies Must Live (1921)
 Shirley of the Circus (1922)
 Calvert's Valley (1922)
 Strength of the Pines (1922)

References

External links

Lule Warrenton at the Women Film Pioneers Project

1862 births
1932 deaths
20th-century American actresses
Actresses from Michigan
American film actresses
American women film directors
Film producers from Michigan
American silent film actresses
Film directors from Michigan
Actors from Flint, Michigan
University of Michigan alumni
Women film pioneers
Screenwriters from Michigan
American women film producers
20th-century American screenwriters
Elocutionists